Abstraction principle may refer to:
 Abstraction principle (law)
 Abstraction principle (computer programming)